Johan Nestor (Nestori) Aronen (27 December 1876 – 7 October 1954) was a Finnish sawmill worker, trade union functionary and politician, born in Pori. He was a member of the Parliament of Finland from 1909 to 1918, representing the Social Democratic Party of Finland (SDP). He was imprisoned in 1918 for having sided with the Reds during the Finnish Civil War.

References

1876 births
1954 deaths
People from Pori
People from Turku and Pori Province (Grand Duchy of Finland)
Social Democratic Party of Finland politicians
Members of the Parliament of Finland (1909–10)
Members of the Parliament of Finland (1910–11)
Members of the Parliament of Finland (1911–13)
Members of the Parliament of Finland (1913–16)
Members of the Parliament of Finland (1916–17)
Members of the Parliament of Finland (1917–19)
People of the Finnish Civil War (Red side)
Prisoners and detainees of Finland